Karting Genk  is a Kart racing track, located in  Genk, a municipality located in the Belgian province of Limburg, near Hasselt.

It was founded in 1983. In 2005, it was completely restyled, in order to get a new FIA homologation. In 2011 it hosted the Karting World Championship. It will host this competition again in 2018.

The track is a regular on the European karting scene, featuring technical corners and hairpins as well as sweeping corners and overtaking opportunities.

References 

http://www.hbvl.be/limburg/genk/michael-schumacher-kart-in-genk.aspx

External links 
Karting Genk website in Dutch (also available in French)

Entertainment companies established in 1983
Kart circuits
Companies based in Limburg (Belgium)
Genk
Sports venues in Limburg (Belgium)